The Halls Heeler was a dog bred by Thomas Simpson Hall to herd cattle on the Hall family's extensive properties in northwestern New South Wales in the 19th century.  On Dartbrook Station, in the Upper Hunter Valley, Hall selectively crossed the offspring of Northumberland Drover's Dogs (Border Collie lineage) that he had imported, with the progeny of dingoes that he had tamed. By 1840 he had bred the type of dog that he needed to control cattle on the massive runs that his family owned, and until he died in 1870 few of these dogs were owned and used by anyone outside the Hall family and their workers. However the death of Thomas Hall and the break-up of the Hall estate coincided with the development of the dog show, and an interest in breeding dogs to specific criteria or standards. The Halls Heeler was further developed into two contemporary dog breeds, the Australian Cattle Dog and the Australian Stumpy Tail Cattle Dog.

History 

George Hall and his family arrived in the New South Wales Colony in 1802. By 1825, George's son Thomas Simpson Hall and some of his older brothers had established two cattle stations in the Hunter Region, Gundebri near the present day Merriwa, and Dartbrook near Aberdeen. In the 1828 census Thomas Hall is described as 20 years old, and the manager of Dartbrook. Using this property as a home base, Hall began a northward expansion into the Liverpool Plains, New England and Queensland, setting up properties for the family and eventually controlling over 1 million acres of good grazing land.

On Dartbrook Thomas Hall set about breeding the cattle needed to stock these extensive holdings, and developed a herd of polled shorthorn cattle from stock imported from Durham in 1830. Getting the cattle to the Sydney markets presented a problem in that thousands of head of cattle had to be moved for thousands of kilometres along unfenced stock routes through sometimes rugged bush and mountain ranges.  A note, in his own writing, records Thomas Hall's anger at losing 200 head in scrub. A droving dog was desperately needed but the colonial working dogs are understood to have been of Old English Sheepdog type (commonly referred to as Smithfields; descendants of these dogs still exist) useful only over short distances and for yard work with domesticated cattle. Thomas Hall addressed the problem by importing several of the dogs used by drovers in Northumberland, his parents’ home county. At this time dogs were generally described by their job, regardless of whether they constituted a ‘breed’ as it is currently understood, and in the manner of the time these blue mottled dogs were known as the Northumberland Blue Merle Drovers Dog.

Thomas Hall crossed his Drovers Dogs with dingoes that he had tamed and then continued to selectively crossbreed until 1840, when he was satisfied with his resultant breed. This working cattle dog was so suited to the Hall's needs that no breed changes were considered necessary by Thomas for the rest of his life. During the next 30 years, the Halls Heelers, as they became known, were used only by the Halls and those who worked for them. Given that they were dependent on the dogs, which gave them an advantage over other cattle breeders, it is understandable that the dogs were not distributed beyond the Halls' properties. It was not until after Thomas Hall's death in 1870, when the properties went to auction with the stock on them that Halls Heelers became freely available.

Jack Timmins was a contract drover working in the Upper Hunter Valley and was employed by the Hall family to take cattle to the Sydney markets. In the late 1840s he obtained a pair of Halls Heelers, from which he bred a line of dogs that he described as "great biters", a characteristic which led to the dogs being called Timmins Biters. Robert Kaleski referred to them as "wonderful workers" in an article titled The Working Dogs of Australia in 1911. Other Hall associates, particularly those on properties distant from Dartbrook near the Queensland border, were also breeding their own dogs from Halls Heeler stock.

In 1976 a monument to Thomas Hall's achievement was erected on Dartbrook Road at the Blue Heeler Bridge in Dartbrook, New South Wales. The plaque inscription says: "This plaque presented by The Australian Cattle Society of NSW commemorates Thomas S. Hall of Dartbrook who in 1840 in this area carried out his breeding experiments with the native dog the dingo and a pair of smooth coated blue merle collies. These dogs known as Halls Heelers became the foundation of today's breed the Australian Cattle Dog."

Appearance and temperament 
While dogs were not routinely bred for consistent appearance before the end of the 19th century, the Halls Heeler was described as a thick-set dingo, usually speckled blue or red in appearance.

Descendants 
By the 1890s, the dogs had attracted the attention of the Cattle Dog Club of Sydney, a group of men with a recreational interest in the new practice of showing dogs competitively. They reportedly adopted the term Australian Cattle Dog to refer to the dogs being bred from bloodlines originating from Thomas Hall's "heelers", and prominent members of the group concentrated on breeding these lines. Of these breeders, the Bagust family was the most influential.  Robert Kaleski, of Moorebank, at the time a young associate of Harry Bagust, noted that in 1893 cattle dog breeders had begun to "fix the type" so he drew up a standard for them on those lines.

Selective breeding of those dogs that were born bob-tailed or without tails from some point in the late 19th century led to the development of the Australian Stumpy Tail Cattle Dog. The Australian Stumpy Tail Cattle Dog is recognised by the Australian Stumpy Tail Cattle Dog Club of New South Wales and by the Australian National Kennel Council in the Working Dogs Group, and it was provisionally accepted by the Fédération Cynologique Internationale in 2005, in Group 1, Section 2 : Cattle Dogs (except Swiss Cattle Dogs) as breed number 351.

References 

Herding dogs
Dog breeds originating in Australia
Extinct dog breeds